ITG Brands, LLC is the third-largest American tobacco  manufacturing company in the United States. It is a subsidiary of British multinational Imperial Brands. ITG Brands markets and sells multiple cigarette and cigar brands and sells blu eCigs. The company was created in 2015 and has its production, headquarters, and regulatory compliance facilities located in Greensboro, North Carolina.

History
ITG Brands was formed in June 2015 as an American subsidiary of British conglomerate Imperial Brands. After competing tobacco companies Reynolds American Inc. and Lorillard Inc. merged in 2015, they were required by the FTC to divest four cigarette brands. Imperial then acquired cigarette brands Winston, Salem, Kool, and Maverick along with blu eCigs from the Reynolds American-Lorillard merger for $7.1 billion. Cigar brands already owned by Imperial included Backwoods, Dutch Masters, and Phillies. David Taylor, the CFO of Lorillard Inc. pre-merger, became ITG Brands’ first CEO in 2015.

ITG Brands announced it would be closing the Reidsville manufacturing plant by April 2020, "affecting 117 manufacturing jobs." It planned to move manufacturing to Greensboro, North Carolina. As of 2022, the number of Greensboro employees was down to 895 from 1700 in 2015.

ITG Brands was one of three tobacco companies warned by the Food and Drug Administration that "they did not have the agency’s approval to claim that their products were free of certain harmful substances, or that they posed less risk to consumers than other tobacco products."

ITG Brands donated $25,000 to the North Carolina Disaster Relief Fund to provide relief for Hurricane Florence.

In 2019, Oliver Kutz was named as ITG Brands’ new CEO and president. He replaced Dan Carr, who had served as the second CEO and president for 16 months. Kutz previously served as Imperial Brand’s general manager of the Russia-AAAA (Americas, Africa, Asia, and Australia) Division.

Brands

 Antonio y Cleopatra
 Backwoods Smokes
 blu eCigs
 Crowns
 Dutch Masters
 El Producto
 Hav-A-Tampa
 Kool
 Maverick
 Montclair
 Phillies
 Rave
 Salem
 Sonoma
 USA Gold
 White Cat
 Winston

References

External links

Tobacco companies of the United States
Imperial Brands
Companies based in Greensboro, North Carolina